Bikku Bitti, also known as Bette Peak, is the highest mountain in Libya at .
It is located on the Dohone spur of the Tibesti Mountains in southern Libya, near the Chadian border.

Bikku Bitti is in one of the least known and least accessible parts of the Sahara Desert. It was climbed in December 2005 by Ginge Fullen and his Chadian guides, who approached from the Chadian side. Although they were not the first to summit the mountain—Fullen reports that "there were a number of cairns on top we could clearly see"—it was the first documented climb.

References

Mountains of Libya
Highest points of countries
Tibesti Mountains